Bob Dalving (born 28 July 1950) is a Belgian footballer. He played in one match for the Belgium national football team in 1976.

References

External links
 

1950 births
Living people
Belgian footballers
Belgium international footballers
Place of birth missing (living people)
Association football defenders